Logan McDonald (born 4 April 2002) is an Australian rules footballer who plays for the Sydney Swans in the Australian Football League (AFL). He was recruited by the Sydney Swans with the 4th draft pick in the 2020 AFL draft.

Early football
McDonald started his playing career at the beginning of high school, with the Applecross Mount Pleasant Junior Football Club in the East Fremantle Junior Football League. He played a total of three years with the club, winning a premiership and participating in 2 grand finals, as well as taking home two best and fairest awards. He also played football for his school, Aquinas College. He was selected in the Under 16s All Australian team in 2018 in the forward line, after he averaged 3 goals a game during his early years with the Perth Football Club. He played  6 games for Perth's colts in 2019, kicking 9 goals with an average of 1.5 a game. He represented Western Australia in the 2019 AFL Under 18 Championships, where he kicked 3 goals in the 3 games he played as a bottom-ager. McDonald lifted his game to a new level in the 2020 WAFL season, kicking 7 goals in the first two games of the season. McDonald finished the season with 21 goals, averaging 2.3 goals per game, winning Perth's goalkicking award and coming runner up in the league's goalkicking award. Draft experts had McDonald placed at being picked anywhere between pick 2 to pick 5, and was eventually taken by Sydney with the 4th pick.

AFL career

2021 season: debut
On debut, McDonald starred for the Swans, kicking 3 goals. He followed up his performance with another two goals the following week, playing alongside forward superstar Lance Franklin, where they combined to kick 5 goals.

At the start of the 2022 season he was offered a four-year contract by the Sydney Swans. He played 17 games during the 2022 season, but was omitted from the club's 2022 AFL Grand Final team after lean returns through the finals.

Statistics
Updated to the end of the 2022 season.

|-
| 2021 ||  || 6
| 7 || 9 || 5 || 38 || 21 || 59 || 22 || 6 || 1.3 || 0.7 || 5.4 || 3.0 || 8.4 || 3.1 || 0.9
|-
| 2022 ||  || 6
| 17 || 15 || 16 || 96 || 49 || 145 || 69 || 26 || 0.9 || 0.9 || 5.6 || 2.9 || 8.5 || 4.1 || 1.5
|- class=sortbottom
! colspan=3 | Career
! 24 !! 24 !! 21 !! 134 !! 70 !! 204 !! 91 !! 32 !! 1.0 !! 0.9 !! 5.6 !! 2.9 !! 8.5 !! 3.8 !! 1.3
|}

Honours and achievements
Individual
 AFL Rising Star nominee: 2022 (round 12)

References

External links

2002 births
Living people
Sydney Swans players
Australian rules footballers from Western Australia
Perth Football Club players